Ali ibn Babawayh Qummi (died 939) was a Twelver Shi'a scholar from the time of the Ghaybat al-Sughra. He's the father of Shaikh Saduq.

He wrote a letter to Imam Muhammad al-Mahdi, asking for prayer for him to have a child, as doctors had told him he could not have one. Thus his son, Shaikh Saduq, was always called: "Oh you that was born by the prayer of Imam Mahdi!".

References

939 deaths
Iranian Shia scholars of Islam
Year of birth unknown
10th-century Iranian people
People from Qom